William Hallam (born in England about 1712; died there about 1758) was an English actor and theatre manager who organized the company that gave the first professionally produced theatrical performances in the New World.

Biography
He was the son of the actor Thomas Hallam, a member of the Drury Lane killed by fellow actor Charles Macklin after a dispute. 

In 1731 he married the actress Anne Berriman. He became manager of the New Wells Theatre in Goodman's Fields, London. In his competition with David Garrick, who managed Drury Lane Theatre, he became bankrupt in 1750, and in the same year organized a dramatic company that was sent, under the direction of his brother Lewis, to the North American colonies and the British West Indies. Before the actors sailed, they studied 24 plays, besides farces and medleys, which in suitable weather were rehearsed aboard ship. They also took with them costumes and scenery. In June 1754, William Hallam sailed for the North American colonies, landing in Philadelphia. He remained with the comedians about one year, but did not perform. Disposing of his half interest to his brother Lewis, he returned to England in 1755, where he soon afterward died.

Notes

References

1710s births
1750s deaths
English theatre managers and producers
18th-century English male actors
English male stage actors